This is a list of municipalities in Luxembourg which have standing links to local communities in other countries known as "town twinning" (usually in Europe) or "sister cities" (usually in the rest of the world).

B
Beckerich
 Iváncsa, Hungary

Bertrange
 Santa Maria Nuova, Italy

Bettembourg

 Flaibano, Italy
 Valpaços, Portugal

Bettendorf
 Vila Pouca de Aguiar, Portugal

Bourscheid
 Burscheid, Germany

C
Clervaux
 Horezu, Romania

Colmar-Berg
 Weilburg, Germany

Consdorf
 Nazaré, Portugal

D
Diekirch

 Arlon, Belgium
 Bitburg, Germany
 Hayange, France
 Liberty, United States
 Monthey, Switzerland

Differdange

 Ahlen, Germany
 Chaves, Portugal
 Fiuminata, Italy
 Longwy, France
 Oxford, United States

Dippach
 Landiras, France

Dudelange

 Arganil, Portugal
 Berane, Montenegro
 Feltre, Italy
 Lauenburg, Germany
 Lębork, Poland
 Manom, France

E
Esch-sur-Alzette

 Coimbra, Portugal
 Cologne, Germany
 Liège, Belgium
 Lille, France
 Mödling, Austria
 Offenbach am Main, Germany
 Puteaux, France
 Rotterdam, Netherlands
 Turin, Italy
 Velletri, Italy
 Zemun (Belgrade), Serbia

F
Frisange
 Saint-Julien-de-Coppel, France

G
Grevenmacher
 Aubière, France

H
Helperknapp
 Zechin, Germany

Hesperange

 Malchin, Germany
 Szerencs, Hungary

J
Junglinster
 Üdersdorf, Germany

K
Käerjeng
 Gaflenz, Austria

Kehlen
 Meckenbeuren, Germany

L
Lintgen

 Lorup, Germany
 Lubomino, Poland
 Vrees, Germany

Luxembourg
 Metz, France

M
Mamer
 Dangé-Saint-Romain, France

Mersch – Beringen

 Behringen (Bispingen), Germany
 Behringen (Hörselberg-Hainich), Germany
 Behringen (Stadtilm), Germany
 Beringe (Peel en Maas), Netherlands
 Beringen, Belgium
 Beringen, Switzerland

Mertzig
 Vöcklamarkt, Austria

Mondorf-les-Bains

 Bad Homburg vor der Höhe, Germany
 Cabourg, France
 Chur, Switzerland
 Mayrhofen, Austria
 Terracina, Italy
 Vale de Cambra, Portugal

N
Niederanven is a member of the Douzelage, a town twinning association of towns across the European Union, alongside with:

 Agros, Cyprus
 Altea, Spain
 Asikkala, Finland
 Bad Kötzting, Germany
 Bellagio, Italy
 Bundoran, Ireland
 Chojna, Poland
 Granville, France
 Holstebro, Denmark
 Houffalize, Belgium
 Judenburg, Austria
 Kőszeg, Hungary
 Marsaskala, Malta
 Meerssen, Netherlands
 Oxelösund, Sweden
 Preveza, Greece
 Rokiškis, Lithuania
 Rovinj, Croatia
 Sesimbra, Portugal
 Sherborne, England, United Kingdom
 Sigulda, Latvia
 Siret, Romania
 Škofja Loka, Slovenia
 Sušice, Czech Republic
 Tryavna, Bulgaria
 Türi, Estonia
 Zvolen, Slovakia

P
Pétange

 Maribor, Slovenia
 Schiffweiler, Germany
 Schio, Italy

Préizerdaul

 Péni, Burkina Faso
 San Agustín, El Salvador

R
Remich
 Bessan, France

Roeser

 Turi, Italy
 Zoufftgen, France

Rosport-Mompach
 Velence, Hungary

Rumelange
 Petnjica, Montenegro

S
Sanem
 Chauffailles, France

Schengen
 Ischgl, Austria

Schifflange
 Drusenheim, France

Schuttrange
 Siegelsbach, Germany

T
Troisvierges is a member of the Charter of European Rural Communities, a town twinning association across the European Union, alongside with:

 Bienvenida, Spain
 Bièvre, Belgium
 Bucine, Italy
 Cashel, Ireland
 Cissé, France
 Desborough, England, United Kingdom
 Esch (Haaren), Netherlands
 Hepstedt, Germany
 Ibănești, Romania
 Kandava (Tukums), Latvia
 Kannus, Finland
 Kolindros, Greece
 Lassee, Austria
 Medzev, Slovakia
 Moravče, Slovenia
 Næstved, Denmark
 Nagycenk, Hungary
 Nadur, Malta
 Ockelbo, Sweden
 Pano Lefkara, Cyprus
 Põlva, Estonia
 Samuel (Soure), Portugal
 Slivo Pole, Bulgaria
 Starý Poddvorov, Czech Republic
 Strzyżów, Poland
 Tisno, Croatia
 Žagarė (Joniškis), Lithuania

V
Vianden

 Compiègne, France
 Huy, Belgium

W
Waldbredimus
 Hrušky, Czech Republic

Walferdange

 Limana, Italy
 Longuyon, France
 Schmitshausen, Germany

Wiltz

 Celorico de Basto, Portugal
 Zavidovići, Bosnia and Herzegovina

Wormeldange
 Mortágua, Portugal

References

Luxembourg
Lists of subdivisions of Luxembourg
Foreign relations of Luxembourg
.
Populated places in Luxembourg
[[Category:Luxembourg geography-related lists]